Reginald Uba (26 July 1911 – 15 August 1972) was an Estonian middle-distance runner. He competed in the men's 1500 metres at the 1936 Summer Olympics.

His son was sports journalist Toomas Uba (1943–2000).

References

External links
 

1911 births
1972 deaths
People from Toila Parish
People from the Governorate of Estonia
Athletes (track and field) at the 1936 Summer Olympics
Estonian male middle-distance runners
Olympic athletes of Estonia